Presidential elections were held for the first time in the Central African Republic on 5 January 1964. In December 1963 the Parliament had formally adopted a constitutional amendment that set the presidential term at seven years. The country was a one-party state at the time, with the Movement for the Social Evolution of Black Africa (MESAN) as the sole legal party. Its leader, incumbent President David Dacko, was the only candidate, and won with 99.97% of the vote and a 93.8% turnout. 

After his victory Dacko formed new government on 11 January 1964, in which he kept positions of  Head of Government and the Minister of Defense for himself, while former Minister of Justice Antoine Guimali was appointed as the new Minister of Foreign Affairs. Dacko also expressed his intention to keep close relations with France and stated that the military would participate in future infrastructure building projects. In his victory speech to Parliament, Dacko also stated that it was "completely normal for national wealth of the country to be exploited or used by the state, alone or in cooperation with private capital".

Results

References

Central Africa
Presidential elections in the Central African Republic
President
One-party elections
Single-candidate elections